Ashmunella todseni is a species of air-breathing land snail, a terrestrial pulmonate gastropod mollusk in the family Polygyridae.

Type specimens

Holotype
The holotype was collected on May 24, 1975 from talus accumulation of igneous rock on the east side of the east branch of Maple Canyon. It is deposited at the Academy of Natural Sciences of Drexel University ANSP 340726.

Paratypes
Paratypes are deposited at

 Academy of Natural Sciences of Drexel University ANSP 340727  
 DelMNH 106683  
 UA 6217
 DMNH 4534  
 National Museum of Natural History USNM 758528  
 University of Texas at El Paso Biodiversity Collections UTEP:ES:4476, UTEP:ES:4744 and UTEP:ES:4746

Distribution
The species has only been collected from Maple and Texas canyons in the northeastern part of the Organ Mountains.

Etymology
The species is named in honor of Dr. Thomas K. Todsen.

References

Polygyridae
Gastropods described in 1977